The Great Western Combination was a football league in south-central England.

History
The league was established in 1939, initially as a wartime competition as many other leagues had been abandoned following the outbreak of World War II. Its original membership was amateur clubs from the area west of London. Although it ceased in 1945, it was re-established in 1946 and a second division was added in 1947; this became the reserve division in 1956. The league folded at the end of the 1963–64 season.

Champions

Member clubs
Member clubs during the league's existence included: 

AEC (1958–1964)
Amersham Town (1949–1956)
Aylesbury Town Corinthians (1958–1964)
Aylesbury United Reserves (1946–1951)
BEA (London) (1954–1964)
BEA (Northholt) (1949–1954)
Bell Punch (1948–1959)
Berkhamsted Town (1946–1951)
Binfield (1946–1951)
Blue Circle (1955–1956)
Bracknell Town (1958–1962)
British Oxygen (1954–1955)
Broomwade (1955–1960)
Bucks NALGO (1950–1951)
Burnham (1947–1964)
Cavendish (1955–1960)
Chalfont St Peter (1948–1958)
Chalvey (1954–1959)
Chelsea Mariners (1955–1956)
Chesham United (1939–1945)
Chesham United Reserves (1946–1948)
Croxley Wanderers (1951–1953)
Eastcote (1951–1953)
Ernest Turner's Sports (1951–1964)
Flackwell Heath (1950–1964)
Ford Sports (1951–1952)
Gerrard's Cross (1954–1956)
Grenadier Guards (1941–1943)
Hanwell Association (1954–1958)
Harefield United (1947–1964)
Harrow Town (1948–1950)
Harrow Town Reserves (1947–1951)
Hayes (1939–1940)
Hazells (1949–1955)
Hemel Hempstead Rovers (1947–1955)
Hemel Hempstead Town (1949–1950)
Henley Town (1939–1940, 1952–1955)
Henley Town Reserves (1951–1952)
Hestairco Sports (1952–1955)
High Duty Alloys (1940–1947)
Huntley & Palmers (1948–1949)
Huntley & Palmer Reserves (1947–1948)
Jackson' Sports (1949–1957)
Kodak (1959–1964)
Loudwater United (1955–1962)
Lyons Club (1948–1950)
Lyons Club Reserves (1947–1948)
Maidenhead North Town (1954–1956)
Maidenhead United (1939–1945)
Maidenhead United Reserves (1946–1949)
Marlow (1939–1945)
Marlow Reserves (1947–1955)
Mill End Sports (1949–1951)
Oxford City (1940–1945)
Pinner (1946–1951)
Princes Risborough (1953–1954)
Queensborough (1958–1964)
RAF Halton (1948–1952)
RAF High Wycombe (1943–1945)
Reading Aerodrome (1953–1957)
Reading Reserves (1940–1945)
Rickmansworth Town Reserves (1954–1956)
Rootes Athletic (1954–1955)
Royal Ascot (1955–1958)
Ruislip Gardens (1952–1955)
Ruislip (1946–1949)
Ruislip Manor Reserves (1947–1949)

Seer Green (1958–1964)
Slough (1939–1940)
Slough Centre (1942–1950)
Slough Centre Reserves (1947–1951)
Slough United (1943–1945)
Southall Corinthians (1951–1964)
Staines Town Reserves (1953–1956)
Stokenchurch Reserves (1954–1955)
Terriers Athletic (1963–1964)
Tring Town (1948–1954)
Twickenham Town (1953–1954)
Uxbridge Reserves (1946–1948)
Uxbridge Town (1939–1945)
Vickers Sports (1952–1957)
Vickers Sports Reserves (1955–1956)
Wendover (1948–1950)
Willesden Reserves (1949–1951)
Windsor & Eton (1939–1945)
Windsor & Eton Reserves (1946–1945)
Windsor Works (1942–1948)
Wingate Reserves (1951–1952)
Wokingham Town (1951–1956)
Wycombe Redfords (1939–1948)
Wycombe Wanderers 'A' (1948–1949)
Wycombe Wanderers Reserves (1947–1948)
Wycombe Wanderers (1939–1945)
Yiewsley (1944–1951)

References

 
Defunct football leagues in England
1939 establishments in England
1964 disestablishments in England